Public School No. 109, also known as Male and Female Primary School No. 5 and Broadway School, was a historic elementary school located at Baltimore, Maryland, United States. It was a two-story red brick utilitarian building featured a central tower capped by a pediment, two large chimneys with arched openings, and an entrance appendage on the south façade housing a stairwell. It was constructed in 1876 as an "open plan" school with classes separated by glass partitions.  It was demolished in late 2003/early 2004 in order to make room for the Kennedy Krieger Institute’s new “Community Behavioral Health Center.”

Public School No. 109 was listed on the National Register of Historic Places in 1979.

References

External links
, including photo from 2004, at Maryland Historical Trust

Public schools in Baltimore
Defunct schools in Maryland
Middle East, Baltimore
School buildings completed in 1876
School buildings on the National Register of Historic Places in Baltimore